Ishiagu is a town in the Ivo Local Government Area in Ebonyi State, Nigeria, located on the plains of the south-eastern savannah belt.
It is the location of the Federal College of Agriculture, Ishiagu.
An open-pit lead/zinc mine was opened in 1965, and closed 17 years later.
Oil spill and oil pipeline vandalism in the area has caused significant environmental damage.

References

External links

Populated places in Ebonyi State